This list shows the IUCN Red List status of 115 mammal species occurring in Spanish territory in the Iberian Peninsula. Seven species are endangered, thirteen are vulnerable, and three are near threatened. If the IUCN Red List status of a species in Spain differs from its global status, the status in Spain is shown next between brackets.

The following tags are used to highlight each species' conservation status as assessed on the respective IUCN Red List:

Order: Rodentia (rodents) 

Rodents make up the largest order of mammals, with over 40% of mammalian species. They have two incisors in the upper and lower jaw which grow continually and must be kept short by gnawing.

Suborder: Castorimorpha
Family: Castoridae (beavers)
Subfamily: Castorinae
Tribe: Castorini
Genus: Castor
 Eurasian beaver, C. fiber 
Suborder: Sciurognathi
Family: Sciuridae (squirrels)
Subfamily: Sciurinae
Tribe: Sciurini
Genus: Sciurus
 Red squirrel, S. vulgaris 
Subfamily: Xerinae
Tribe: Marmotini
Genus: Marmota
 Alpine marmot, M. marmota   introduced
Family: Gliridae (dormice)
Subfamily: Leithiinae
Genus: Eliomys
 Garden dormouse, E. quercinus 
Subfamily: Glirinae
Genus: Glis
 European edible dormouse, G. glis LC
Suborder: Myomorpha
Family: Cricetidae (hamsters, voles, lemmings)
Subfamily: Arvicolinae
Genus: Arvicola
 Southwestern water vole, A. sapidus 
 European water vole, A. amphibius 
Genus: Chionomys
 Snow vole, C. nivalis LC
Genus: Microtus
 Cabrera's vole, M. cabrerae 
 Field vole, M. agrestis LC
 Common vole, M. arvalis LC
 Mediterranean pine vole, M. duodecimcostatus LC
 Gerbe's vole, M. gerbei LC
 Lusitanian pine vole, M. lusitanicus LC
Genus: Myodes
 Bank vole, M. glareolus LC
Genus: Ondatra
 Muskrat, O. zibethicus LC introduced
Family: Muridae (mice and rats)
Subfamily: Murinae
Genus: Apodemus
 Yellow-necked mouse, A. flavicollis LC
 Wood mouse, A. sylvaticus LC
Genus: Micromys
 Eurasian harvest mouse, M. minutus LC
Genus: Mus
 House mouse, M. musculus LC
 Algerian mouse, M. spretus LC
Genus: Rattus
Brown rat, R. norvegicus  introduced
 Black rat, R. rattus  introduced
Family: Myocastoridae (coypu)
Subfamily: Myocastorinae
Genus: Myocastor
 Coypu, M. coypus  introduced

Order: Lagomorpha (lagomorphs) 

The lagomorphs comprise two families, Leporidae (hares and rabbits), and Ochotonidae (pikas). Though they can resemble rodents, and were classified as a superfamily in that order until the early 20th century, they have since been considered a separate order. They differ from rodents in a number of physical characteristics, such as having four incisors in the upper jaw rather than two.

Family: Leporidae (rabbits, hares)
Genus: Lepus
 Broom hare, L. castroviejoi 
 European hare, L. europaeus 
 Granada hare, L. granatensis 
Genus: Oryctolagus
 European rabbit, O. cuniculus

Order: Erinaceomorpha (hedgehogs and gymnures) 

The order Erinaceomorpha contains a single family, Erinaceidae, which comprise the hedgehogs and gymnures. The hedgehogs are easily recognised by their spines while gymnures look more like large rats.

Family: Erinaceidae (hedgehogs)
Subfamily: Erinaceinae
Genus: Atelerix
 North African hedgehog, A. algirus  introduced
Genus: Erinaceus
 West European hedgehog, E. europaeus

Order: Soricomorpha (shrews, moles, and solenodons) 

The "shrew-forms" are insectivorous mammals. The shrews and solenodons closely resemble mice while the moles are stout bodied burrowers.
Family: Soricidae (shrews)
Subfamily: Crocidurinae
Genus: Crocidura
 Greater white-toothed shrew, C. russula 
Lesser white-toothed shrew, C. suaveolens 
Genus: Suncus
 Etruscan shrew, S. etruscus 
Subfamily: Soricinae
Tribe: Nectogalini
Genus: Neomys
 Southern water shrew, N. anomalus 
 Eurasian water shrew, N. fodiens 
Tribe: Soricini
Genus: Sorex
 Common shrew, S. araneus 
 Crowned shrew, S. coronatus 
 Iberian shrew, S. granarius 
 Eurasian pygmy shrew, S. minutus 
Family: Talpidae (moles)
Subfamily: Talpinae
Tribe: Desmanini
Genus: Galemys
 Pyrenean desman, G. pyrenaicus 
Tribe: Talpini
Genus: Talpa (genus)
 European mole, T. europaea 
 Iberian mole, T. occidentalis

Order: Chiroptera (bats) 

The bats' most distinguishing feature is that their forelimbs are developed as wings, making them the only mammals capable of flight. Bat species account for about 20% of all mammals.
Suborder: Microchiroptera
Family: Vespertilionidae
Subfamily: Myotinae
Genus: Myotis
Alcathoe bat, M. alcathoe 
Bechstein's bat, M. bechsteini 
Lesser mouse-eared bat, M. blythii 
Long-fingered bat, M. capaccinii 
Cryptic myotis, M. crypticus
Daubenton's bat, M. daubentonii  
Geoffroy's bat, M. emarginatus 
Escalera's bat, M. escalerai 
Greater mouse-eared bat, M. myotis 
Whiskered bat, M. mystacinus 
Natterer's bat, M. nattereri 
Subfamily: Vespertilioninae
Genus: Barbastella
Western barbastelle, B. barbastellus 
Genus: Eptesicus
Meridional serotine, E. isabellinus 
Serotine bat, E. serotinus 
Genus: Hypsugo
Savi's pipistrelle, H. savii 
Genus: Nyctalus
Greater noctule bat, N. lasiopterus 
Lesser noctule, N. leisleri 
Common noctule, N. noctula 
Genus: Pipistrellus
Nathusius' pipistrelle, P. nathusii 
Kuhl's pipistrelle, P. kuhlii 
Common pipistrelle, P. pipistrellus 
Soprano pipistrelle, P. pygmaeus 
Genus: Plecotus
Alpine long-eared bat, P. macrobullaris 
Brown long-eared bat, P. auritus 
Grey long-eared bat, P. austriacus 
Subfamily: Miniopterinae
Genus: Miniopterus
Common bent-wing bat, M. schreibersii 
Family: Molossidae
Genus: Tadarida
European free-tailed bat, T. teniotis 
Family: Rhinolophidae
Subfamily: Rhinolophinae
Genus: Rhinolophus
Mediterranean horseshoe bat, R. euryale 
Greater horseshoe bat, R. ferrumequinum 
Lesser horseshoe bat, R. hipposideros 
Mehely's horseshoe bat, R. mehelyi

Order: Cetacea (whales) 

The order Cetacea includes whales, dolphins and porpoises. They are the mammals most fully adapted to aquatic life with a spindle-shaped nearly hairless body, protected by a thick layer of blubber, and forelimbs and tail modified to provide propulsion underwater.
Suborder: Mysticeti
Family: Balaenidae (right whales)
Genus: Eubalaena
North Atlantic right whale, E. glacialis 
Family: Balaenopteridae (rorquals)
Subfamily: Balaenopterinae
Genus: Balaenoptera
Blue whale, B. musculus 
 Sei whale, B. borealis EN
Fin whale, B. physalus 
Minke whale, B. acutorostrata 
Subfamily: Megapterinae
Genus: Megaptera
Humpback whale, M. novaeangliae 
Suborder: Odontoceti
Family: Delphinidae (marine dolphins)
 Genus: Lagenorhynchus
 White-beaked dolphin, Lagenorhynchus albirostris LC
 Genus: Leucopleurus
 Atlantic white-sided dolphin, Leucopleurus acutus LC
Genus: Steno
 Rough-toothed dolphin, S. bredanensis DD
Genus: Stenella
Striped dolphin, S. coeruleoalba 
Atlantic spotted dolphin, S. frontalis 
Genus: Delphinus
Common dolphin, D. delphis 
Genus: Globicephala
 Pilot whale, G. melas DD
 Short-finned pilot whale, G. macrorhynchus 
Genus: Grampus
 Risso's dolphin, G. griseus DD
Genus: Feresa
Pygmy killer whale, F. attenuata 
Genus: Pseudorca
False killer whale, P. crassidens 
Genus: Orcinus
Orca, O. orca 
Genus: Tursiops
 Common bottlenose dolphin, T. truncatus VU
Family: Kogiidae (small sperm whales)
Genus: Kogia
 Pygmy sperm whale, K. breviceps DD
 Dwarf sperm whale, K. sima DD
Family: Phocoenidae (porpoises)
Genus: Phocoena
 Harbour porpoise, P. phocoena VU
Family: Physeteridae (sperm whales)
Genus: Physeter
 Sperm whale, P. macrocephalus VU
Family: Ziphiidae (beaked whales)
Genus: Ziphius
 Cuvier's beaked whale, Z. cavirostris DD
Subfamily: Hyperoodontinae
Genus: Hyperoodon
 Northern bottlenose whale, H. ampullatus DD
Genus: Mesoplodon
 Sowerby's beaked whale, M. bidens DD
 Blainville's beaked whale, M. densirostris DD
 Gervais' beaked whale, M. europaeus DD
 True's beaked whale, M. mirus DD

Order: Carnivora (carnivorans) 

There are over 260 species of carnivorans, the majority of which feed primarily on meat. They have a characteristic skull shape and dentition. 
Suborder: Feliformia
Family: Felidae
Subfamily: Felinae
Genus: Felis
 European wildcat, F. silvestris 
Genus: Lynx
 Iberian lynx, L. pardinus 
Family: Viverridae
Subfamily: Viverrinae
Genus: Genetta
 Common genet, G. genetta  introduced
Family: Herpestidae (mongooses)
Genus: Herpestes
 Egyptian mongoose, H. ichneumon 
Suborder: Caniformia
Family: Canidae (dogs, foxes)
Genus: Canis
 Gray wolf, C. lupus 
 Iberian wolf, C. l. signatus
Genus: Vulpes
 Red fox, V. vulpes 
Family: Ursidae (bears)
Genus: Ursus
 Brown bear, U. arctos 
 Cantabrian brown bear, U. a. arctos
Family: Procyonidae (raccoons)
Genus: Procyon
 Raccoon, P. lotor  introduced
Family: Mustelidae (mustelids)
Genus: Lutra
 European otter, L. lutra 
Genus: Martes
 Beech marten, M. foina 
 European pine marten, M. martes 
Genus: Meles
European badger, M. meles 
Genus: Mustela
Stoat, M. erminea 
 European mink, M. lutreola 
Least weasel, M. nivalis 
European polecat, M. putorius 
Genus: Neogale
American mink, N. vison  introduced

Order: Artiodactyla (even-toed ungulates) 

The even-toed ungulates are ungulates whose weight is borne about equally by the third and fourth toes, rather than mostly or entirely by the third as in perissodactyls. There are about 220 artiodactyl species, including many that are of great economic importance to humans.
Family: Suidae (pigs)
Subfamily: Suinae
Genus: Sus
Wild boar, S. scrofa 
Family: Cervidae (deer)
Subfamily: Cervinae
Genus: Cervus
Red deer, C. elaphus 
 Spanish red deer, C. e. hispanicus
Genus: Dama
European fallow deer, D. dama  introduced
Subfamily: Capreolinae
Genus: Capreolus
Roe deer, C. capreolus 
Family: Bovidae
Subfamily: Bovinae
Genus: Bison
European bison, B. bonasus 
Genus: Bos
Aurochs, B. primigenius 
Subfamily: Caprinae
Genus: Ammotragus
Barbary sheep, A. lervia  introduced
Genus: Capra
Iberian ibex, C. pyrenaica 
Southeastern Spanish ibex, C. p. hispanica
Portuguese ibex, C. p. lusitanica 
Pyrenean ibex, C. p. pyrenaica 
Western Spanish ibex, C. p. victoriae
Genus: Ovis
European mouflon, O. aries introduced
Genus: Rupicapra
Pyrenean chamois, R. pyrenaica

Locally extinct 

The following species are locally extinct in the area but continue to exist elsewhere:
Alpine shrew, Sorex alpinus
Gray whale, Eschrichtius robustus
Eurasian lynx, Lynx lynx
Mediterranean monk seal, Monachus monachus
Wild horse, Equus ferus

See also
List of chordate orders
Lists of mammals by region
Mammal classification

References

Further reading 

Spain